Enzo Ruiz may refer to:
 Enzo Ruiz (Uruguayan footballer) (born 1988), Uruguayan left back for Deportes La Serena
 Enzo Ruiz (Argentine footballer) (born 1989), Argentine footballer for Unión Española